McCone County is a county located in the U.S. state of Montana. As of the 2020 census, the population was 1,729. Its county seat is Circle.

The county was created in 1919. It was named for State Senator George McCone, who had been one of the first county commissioners of Dawson County.

Geography

Major highways
  Montana Highway 13
  Montana Highway 24
  Montana Highway 200

Adjacent counties

 Valley County - west
 Roosevelt County - north
 Richland County - northeast
 Dawson County - east
 Prairie County - south
 Garfield County - west

National protected area
 Charles M. Russell National Wildlife Refuge (part)

Demographics

2000 census
As of the 2000 census, of 2000, there were 1,977 people, 810 households, and 596 families living in the county. The population density was less than 1 people per square mile (0/km2), the 12th lowest in the United States. There were 1,087 housing units at an average density of 0 per square mile (0/km2). The racial makeup of the county was 97.37% White, 0.10% Black or African American, 1.06% Native American, 0.20% Asian, and 1.37% from two or more races.  0.90% of the population were Hispanic or Latino of any race. 37.4% were of German, 22.7% Norwegian, 8.8% American and 8.5% Irish ancestry. 99.5% spoke English and 0.5% German as their first language.

There were 810 households, out of which 30.20% had children under the age of 18 living with them, 66.90% were married couples living together, 3.80% had a female householder with no husband present, and 26.30% were non-families. 24.60% of all households were made up of individuals, and 11.40% had someone living alone who was 65 years of age or older. The average household size was 2.44 and the average family size was 2.89.

The county population contained 24.80% under the age of 18, 5.40% from 18 to 24, 24.30% from 25 to 44, 26.50% from 45 to 64, and 18.90% who were 65 years of age or older. The median age was 42 years. For every 100 females there were 99.70 males. For every 100 females age 18 and over, there were 103.30 males.

The median income for a household in the county was $29,718, and the median income for a family was $35,887. Males had a median income of $22,768 versus $15,368 for females. The per capita income for the county was $15,162. About 14.10% of families and 16.80% of the population were below the poverty line, including 19.40% of those under age 18 and 11.20% of those age 65 or over.

2010 census
As of the 2010 census, there were 1,734 people, 774 households, and 514 families living in the county. The racial makeup of the county was 98.0% white, 0.4% American Indian, 0.1% black or African American, 0.1% Asian, 0.1% from other races, and 1.2% from two or more races. Those of Hispanic or Latino origin made up 0.7% of the population. In terms of ancestry, 44.5% were German, 23.1% were Norwegian, 12.7% were American, 12.0% were Irish, and 8.8% were English.

Of the 774 households, 23.4% had children under the age of 18 living with them, 61.0% were married couples living together, 3.2% had a female householder with no husband present, 33.6% were non-families, and 31.7% of all households were made up of individuals. The average household size was 2.22 and the average family size was 2.77. The median age was 48.9 years.

The median income for a household in the county was $48,167 and the median income for a family was $56,406. Males had a median income of $33,185 versus $26,454 for females. The per capita income for the county was $23,265. About 5.9% of families and 8.6% of the population were below the poverty line, including 10.3% of those under age 18 and 11.5% of those age 65 or over.

Communities

Town
 Circle (county seat)

Census-designated places
 Brockway
 Prairie Elk Colony
 Vida

Other unincorporated communities

 Nickwall
 Weldon

Politics
McCone county is a solid Republican county. In the 2004 Presidential Election McCone County gave 69.6% of its votes to President George W. Bush and 28.1% to Senator John Kerry. In the 2012 presidential election Governor Mitt Romney received 75.0% of the county's votes, while President Barack Obama only received 22.5% of the votes.

See also
 List of lakes in McCone County, Montana
 List of mountains in McCone County, Montana
 National Register of Historic Places listings in McCone County MT

References

External links
 McCone Coutnty Official website
 Circle, MT Official website

 
1919 establishments in Montana
Populated places established in 1919